The Mountain Home Carnegie Library, at 180 S. 3rd St. East, in Mountain Home, Idaho, was built as a Carnegie library in 1908. It was listed on the National Register of Historic Places in 1978.

History 
It was built in 1908.

Architecture 
It was designed by the architectural firm of Tourtelotte & Co.  It is a one-story white pressed brick building upon a raised cut stone foundation.  It is "western colonial revival" in style. It has a Tuscan-columned portico with a corniced entablature topped by a balustrade.  It has a bracketed, overhanging hipped roof.

References

Carnegie libraries in Idaho
National Register of Historic Places in Elmore County, Idaho
Library buildings completed in 1908